Duni is a surname. Notable people with the surname include:

 Egidio Duni (1708–1775), Italian composer
Elina Duni (born 1981), Swiss-Albanian singer and composer
Juma Duni Haji (born 1950), Tanzanian politician and civil servant

See also
Duni, Assam, an urban village in India